Frane Katalinić (4 October 1891 – 3 April 1976) was a Croatian rower who competed for Italy in the 1924 Summer Olympics.

In 1924, he won the bronze medal as crew member of the Italian boat in the men's eight competition with two brothers Ante and Šimun, and Latino Galasso, Vittorio Gliubich, Giuseppe Crivelli, Petar Ivanov, Bruno Sorić, Carlo Toniatti.

References

External links
 profile

1891 births
1976 deaths
Sportspeople from Zadar
Italian male rowers
Italian people of Croatian descent
Croatian male rowers
Olympic rowers of Italy
Rowers at the 1924 Summer Olympics
Olympic bronze medalists for Italy
Olympic medalists in rowing
Medalists at the 1924 Summer Olympics
European Rowing Championships medalists